, is a 1957 color Japanese film directed by Kazuo Mori and based on a novel by Matsutarō Kawaguchi. At the 1957 Asia-Pacific Film Festival the film won awards for best film and best cinematography (Kazuo Miyagawa). The film also won a special award at the 1958 Mainichi Film Concours.

Cast 
Source:
 Ayako Wakao as Princess Kazu, a.k.a. Kazunomiya
 Raizo Ichikawa as Prince Arisugawa Taruhito
 Fujiko Yamamoto as Yuhide, Princess Kazu's waiting woman
 Shunji Natsume as Emperor Kōmei
 Kuniko Miyake as Tsuneko, Kazunomiya's mother
 Eijirō Tōno as Tomofusa Kunokura, Yuhide's father
 Eitaro Ozawa as Iwakura Tomomi (as Sakae Ozawa)
 Yoichi Funaki as Tokugawa Iemochi
 Toshio Hosokawa as Tokugawa Yoshinobu
 Masao Mishima as Sakai Tadaaki, the Kyoto Shoshidai
 Kikue Mōri as Honjuin, 13th Shogun's mother
 Kimiko Tachibana as Oriko
 Hisao Toake as Kujō Hisatada, the Kampaku
 Eijirō Yanagi as Ryuan, Yuhide's real father
 Hisako Takihana as Tenshō-in
 Seishirō Hara as Ōmura Masujirō
 Ryosuke Kagawa as Hashimoto Sanehisa, Kazunomiya's grandfather

See also 
 Suzakumon

References

External links 
 
  http://www.raizofan.net/link4/movie2/kojyo.htm

1957 films
Films directed by Kazuo Mori
Daiei Film films
Films scored by Ichirō Saitō
Films produced by Masaichi Nagata
Films set in Bakumatsu
Cultural depictions of Tokugawa Yoshinobu
1950s Japanese films